Serbia is scheduled to compete at the 2017 World Aquatics Championships in Budapest, Hungary from 14 July to 30 July.

Medalists

Diving

Serbia has entered 1 diver (one female).

Open water swimming

Serbia has entered three open water swimmers (two male and one female).

Swimming

Serbian swimmers have achieved qualifying standards in the following events (up to a maximum of 2 swimmers in each event at the A-standard entry time, and 1 at the B-standard):

Men

Women

Synchronized swimming

Serbia's synchronized swimming team consisted of 2 athletes (2 female).

Water polo

Serbia qualified a men's team.

Summary

Men's tournament

Team roster

Gojko Pijetlović
Dušan Mandić
Viktor Rašović
Sava Ranđelović
Miloš Ćuk
Duško Pijetlović
Nemanja Ubović
Milan Aleksić
Nikola Jakšić
Filip Filipović (c)
Andrija Prlainović
Stefan Mitrović
Branislav Mitrović

Group play

Quarterfinals

Semifinals

Third place game

References

Nations at the 2017 World Aquatics Championships
Serbia at the World Aquatics Championships
2017 in Serbian sport